Ashton is a lightly populated locality in the Canterbury region of New Zealand's South Island.  It is situated on the Canterbury Plains south of Ashburton, on the Pacific Ocean coastline.  It is on the southern side of the Ashburton River / Hakatere's mouth.  Nearby settlements include Huntingdon and Wheatstone to the north, Waterton to the southwest, and across the Ashburton River / Hakatere, Riverside to the northeast.

Demographics
Ashton is part of the Eiffelton statistical area.

References 

Ashburton District
Populated places in Canterbury, New Zealand